A list of mainland Chinese films released in 1995:

See also 
 1995 in China

References

External links
IMDb list of Chinese films

Chinese
Films
1995